"Stickwitu" is a song recorded by American girl group the Pussycat Dolls for their debut studio album PCD (2005). It was written by Franne Golde, Kasia Livingston and Robert Palmer and produced by Ron Fair. A pop ballad with soul influences, the song finds the group celebrating monogamous relationships, with music critics drawing comparisons to fellow girl groups, Cover Girls, Sweet Sensation, and the Spice Girls. It was released as the album's second single on September 26, 2005, by A&M Records and Interscope Records.

Upon its release, "Stickwitu" received mixed reviews from critics, with some complimenting the production and vocal performances, while others criticized its placement on the album. Commercially, "Stickwitu" was a chart success, peaking at number five on the US Billboard Hot 100, as well as becoming the Pussycat Dolls' second consecutive number-one in New Zealand and the United Kingdom, and peaking atop the US Mainstream Top 40, making the Pussycat Dolls the first girl group since Destiny's Child in 2001 to do so. It was certified platinum by the Recording Industry Association of America (RIAA) for mastertone sales of one million units.

Nigel Dick directed the accompanying music video for "Stickwitu", with principal photography taking place in various places around Los Angeles, including the Orpheum Theatre. With the aim to make each member more identifiable, the music video depicts a day of the group's tour life. To further promote the single, the Pussycat Dolls performed the song during several televised appearances, and in their concert tours PCD World Tour (2006–2007) and Doll Domination Tour (2009). The song received a Grammy Award nomination for Best Pop Performance by a Duo or Group with Vocals and was regarded as one of the greatest girl group songs of all time by Billboard.

Writing and production 
"Stickwitu" was written by Franne Golde, Kasia Livingston and Robert Palmer. Production was overseen by Ron Fair with co-producer Tal Herzberg, who engineered the song with Mike Hogue's assistance. Fair also arranged and conducted the strings, which were recorded by Allen Sides. The Pussycat Dolls' vocals were recorded by Mike "Angry" Eleopoulos. The song was mixed by Peter Mokran at the Record Plant in Hollywood, California.

Music and lyrics 

"Stickwitu" was written in the key of A major and a slow tempo, swinging 72 beats per minute. The song was composed using  time and follows a simple chord progression of D - A(9)/C♯ – Bm7 – A7 – Bm7 and A/C♯. The Pussycat Dolls' vocals on the song span F♯3 – E5. Lead singer Nicole Scherzinger was noted for using the "thin end of [her] alto-into-soprano register". A pop song with soul influences, "Stickwitu" features strings accompanied by bass, harmonica, organ, piano, and the Rhodes piano.

Kalefah Sanneh of The New York Times found the melody to be simple, adding that "the beat keeps dropping out and returning and growing and shrinking, confounding expectations". Chuck Taylor of Billboard noted that "Stickwitu" is reminiscent of the works of fellow girl groups Cover Girls and Sweet Sensation, while Tony Heywood from musicOMH compared the song to the works of the Spice Girls. An ode to monogamous relationships, the Pussycat Dolls croon during the chorus, "Nobody gonna love me better / I'ma stickwitu forever".

Release
In July 2005, MTV News reported that "Beep", featuring will.i.am, was a "potential second single". However, on September 26, 2005, A&M Records and Interscope Records serviced "Stickwitu" to contemporary hit radio stations as the second single from PCD. Jeff Leeds of The New York Times noted that the release of the single coincided with the label strucking a deal with the toymaker Hasbro to create a line of dolls modeled after the group. The aim of "Stickwitu" was to appeal to a wider and younger demographic, managing to receive airplay on outlets such as Radio Disney. In response to the release of the single, Scherzinger felt it was a strong move for them, as opposed to coming out with "Beep", noting: "occasionally we get the skeptical people, but we go, 'Give us a chance'."

An urban remix featuring singer Avant was released in December 2005. The remix has identical credits to the original "Stickwitu", with the addition of Avant as a songwriter and Peter Mokran as a remixer. Scherzinger recorded new vocals with Avant in a similar way Avant sang with Keke Wyatt on "My First Love". The remix was included on the tour edition (2006) of PCD and on Avant's fourth studio album Director (2006).

Critical reception 

Jim Carroll of the Irish Times wrote that "Stickwitu" is "one of the best pop ballads of recent years". Taylor was surprised of "Stickwitu"'s release following "Don't Cha" and praised for being "beautifully sung, craftily produced and refreshingly gimmick-free". He continued praising the "catchy" chorus noting the "track is unlike anything else on the air".  While reviewing PCD, Linda McGee of RTÉ   wrote that the song display's "the real intensity of spirit in the music of the" group. Sanneh felt that the song "might be even better" than 'Don't Cha'. Paul Scott of Stylus Magazine agreed with Sanneh adding that it's "pretty enough but just sort of mills around without getting up the courage to go [over the top], and that's actually a good thing". Although musicOMHs John Murphy appreciated the group's vocal performances and harmonies, he noted that "[none of the group members] have a particular strong vocal" and the song "doesn't particularly stick in the mind very much". Spence D. of IGN shared similar thoughts with Murphy writing that although Scherzinger "has a pleasing enough voice" she "never really presents anything that could come close to being called a signature sound". Spence D. also criticized the song's placement on the album.

Similarly, AllMusic's Stephen Thomas Erlewine lamented the inclusion of "Stickwitu" on the album, stating: "PCD seems like it will be that rare thing: a mainstream club/dance album devoted to nothing but dance songs. Then, reality comes crashing in with the fourth song, 'Stickwitu', the inevitable romantic slow jam whose sappiness undercuts the joyous carnal celebration of the first three songs." Sal Cinquenmani from Slant Magazine found it difficult to take the album's ballads—"Stickwitu" and "How Many Times, How Many Lies"—seriously when followed by "a song that begs a man to 'loosen up my buttons'". Kat Bein of the Miami New Times wrote that the song was "in the running for most trite lyrics of all time". Nathan Rabin from The A.V. Club described it as a "saccharine, sleepy ballad". Writing for Sputnikmusic, Nick Butler described "Stickwitu" as a "limp, lifeless ode". However he did note that "it's nowhere near as sickly or disgustingly submissive and sexist as something like Destiny's Child's 'Cater 2 U'". Kevin Courtney of the Irish Times gave "Stickwitu" two out of five stars, noting that "they don't want to be one-hit wonders".

Accolades 

"Stickwitu" was nominated for Best Pop Performance by a Duo or Group with Vocals at the 49th Annual Grammy Awards (2007). Its remix featuring Avant was nominated for Best R&B/Soul Single – Group, Band or Duo at the 2007 Soul Train Music Awards. In May 2007, the song won a BDS Certified Spin Award for receiving 300,000 radio spins in the United States, and was listed as one of the recipients of the BMI Pop Award.

In 2017, "Stickwitu" was ranked at number 68 on Billboards "100 Greatest Girl Group Songs of All Time: Critics' Picks", with Taylor Weaterby writing that the Pussycat Dolls "created one of the most heartfelt ballads in modern girl group history". Weaterby added, "the song is likely still making couples everywhere sway along and fall deeper in love" for years to come.

Commercial performance 
In the United States, "Stickwitu" debuted on the Billboard Hot 100 at number 85 on the issue dated October 22, 2005. On the issue dated November 26, 2005, it leaped from number 18 to number nine, entering the top ten. In its 11th week, the song peaked at number five. The song became the Pussycat Dolls' first number-one on the Mainstream Top 40, making the group the first girl group to peak atop the chart since Destiny's Child in 2001. On the US Hot R&B/Hip-Hop Songs, the remix featuring Avant debuted at number 73, with 3.6 million audience impressions (up by 37%); it ultimately peaked at number 63. "Stickwitu" was certified platinum by the Recording Industry Association of America (RIAA) on July 11, 2007, for mastertone sales of one million units. 

Across Europe, "Stickwitu" performed strongly, debuting at number two on the European Hot 100 Singles and attaining the same position in Ireland, the Netherlands, and Scotland, as well as number three in Norway, number five in Belgium (Flanders), number six in Italy and Switzerland, number seven in France, and number eight in the Czech Republic. In New Zealand, "Stickwitu" peaked at number one for two non-consecutive weeks, and was certified gold by Recorded Music NZ (RMNZ).

On the UK Singles Chart, "Stickwitu" debuted at number one on December 10, 2005, with first-week sales of 43,989 copies, becoming the Pussycat Dolls' second consecutive number-one song in the United Kingdom, after "Don't Cha" debuted atop 12 weeks before. In its second week, the song remained at number one, with a 28.8% sales decrease, selling 31,311 copies. It was certified gold by the British Phonographic Industry (BPI) for sales of 400,000 units in the UK. The Official Charts Company (OCC) ranks "Stickwitu" as the Pussycat Dolls' fourth most successful song on the UK Singles Chart, and the 74th best-selling song by a girl group.

Music video

The song's music video, directed by Nigel Dick, premiered on MTV.com on October 13, 2005. According to MTV, the clip was filmed in different places across Los Angeles including the Orpheum Theatre over the course of two days. The Pussycat Dolls enlisted Dick to direct the video as they wanted to maintain their momentum garnered from their debut single, "Don't Cha". Dick admitted that he felt pressure to deliver. "This video establishes the way they want to be seen from now on. But that's the way it's always been for me. I've been very lucky in my career to do videos for people that are very crucial in artist's careers." The group felt "Stickwitu" would help each girl be more identifiable by showing different sides of their personalities. Scherzinger elaborated that "this video shows much more vulnerability. Part of it is [showing] the strength to do what we do [as performers]; the other is to show that we have our vulnerabilities in life with trying to hold up relationships while we're on the road. We wanted to make sure that each of us was identifiable in this video, that you got to know each girl a little bit more, and get to see what we're like on and off tour."

MTV's James Montgomery said that the video manages to be "high-fashion and low-brow, glamorous and, um, gritty at the same time", where, according to Scherzinger, it's "a day in the life of the Pussycat Dolls on the road." The director added that the music video is "a photographic [rendition of] the life of the Pussycat Dolls: traveling around, getting ready for gigs, being on the tour bus, doing a photo session, waking up in a motel, talking to the boyfriend on the phone, sound-checking. It's informal but beautiful. It's not rock and roll; it's the urban-pop world."

Live performances

On December 7, 2005, the Pussycat Dolls performed at the annual KIIS-FM Jingle Ball at the Shrine Auditorium in Los Angeles, California with some members wearing "festive candy-cane-striped belly shirts and red-and-green capri pants." The set list included "Stickwitu", "Don't Cha", and "Wait a Minute". On March 4, 2006, the Pussycat Dolls and Avant performed "Stickwitu" at the 20th Soul Train Music Awards. On June 30, 2006, the group performed "Don't Cha", "Buttons" and "Stickwitu" on Good Morning America as part of its Summer Concert Series. On July 7, 2007, the Pussycat Dolls together with other artists performed at the Live Earth Concerts, which were held to raise awareness of global warming. They performed "Don't Cha", "Stickwitu", and "Buttons".

"Stickwitu" was included on the group's first live album PCD Live from London (2006). The song was part of the set list while opening for The Black Eyed Peas' Honda Civic Tour (2006), Christina Aguilera's Back to Basics Tour (2007), and The Circus Starring Britney Spears (2009) as well as their own headline tours, PCD World Tour (2006–07) and Doll Domination Tour (2009). While reviewing the latter tour, Alex Macpherson of The Guardian praised Scherzinger's "inventive and versatile" vocals which are "gently crooning the sweet ballad."

In 2012, Scherzinger performed "Stickwitu" as part of a Pussycat Dolls medley throughout her first solo tour in support of her debut studio album, Killer Love (2011).

Track listings and formats

US 12-inch vinyl and digital single
 "Stickwitu" (album version) – 3:27
 "Santa Baby" – 3:00
 "Stickwitu" (R&B Remix)  (featuring Avant) – 3:17

European CD single
 "Stickwitu" (album version) – 3:27
 "Stickwitu" (R&B Remix) (featuring Avant) – 3:17

Australian and European maxi CD single
 "Stickwitu" (album version) – 3:27
 "Santa Baby" – 3:00
 "Stickwitu" (R&B Remix) (featuring Avant) – 3:17
 "Stickwitu" (music video)

Credits and personnel 
Credits adapted from the liner notes of PCD.

Mixing
Mixed at The Record Plant (Hollywood, California).

Personnel
Mike "Angry" Eleopoulos – recording
Ron Fair – producer, arrangement, conductor, harmonica, organ, piano, rhodes
Franne Golde – songwriter
Tal Herzberg – co-producer, engineering, Pro Tools, bass
Mike Hogue – assistant mix engineer
Cori Jacobs – rhodes
Kasia Livingston – songwriter
Peter Mokran – mixing
Robert Palmer – songwriter, original drum programming
Allen Sides – string recording
The PCD orchestra – strings

Charts

Weekly charts

Year-end charts

Decade-end charts

Certifications

Release history

See also
List of number-one singles from the 2000s (New Zealand)
List of UK Singles Chart number ones of the 2000s
List of Billboard Mainstream Top 40 number-one songs of 2006

Notes

References

External links 
 Official website

The Pussycat Dolls songs
2005 songs
2005 singles
Songs written by Franne Golde
Song recordings produced by Ron Fair
Pop ballads
Contemporary R&B ballads
2000s ballads
Number-one singles in New Zealand
UK Singles Chart number-one singles
Music videos directed by Nigel Dick
Articles containing video clips
Hip hop soul songs